{
  "type": "ExternalData",
  "service": "page",
  "title": "West and East Jersey Dividing Lines.map"
}
The Coxe–Barclay Line was a boundary line or partition line drawn through the Province of New Jersey during the colonial period, dividing it into the Province of West Jersey and the Province of East Jersey. Surveyor General George Keith surveyed a northwesterly partition line from Little Egg Harbor that veered too far to the west, and was stopped by the order of Dr. Daniel Coxe, the governor of West Jersey.  Keith ended his line when he reached the South Branch of the Raritan River in what is now Three Bridges in Readington Township. Governor Coxe, and his East Jersey counterpart, Governor Robert Barclay met in London to set a compromise boundary following the South and North Branches of the Raritan River, the Lamington (or Black) River, a straight line to the head of the Passaic River, along the Pompton and Pequannock Rivers, and then a straight line northeast to New Jersey–New York border.  The East Jersey proprietors disowned this line in 1695 and it was formally rescinded by the colonial legislature in 1718.

Today, the Coxe–Barclay line survives in the eastern boundaries of present-day Morris County and Sussex County and the northern boundary of Somerset County.

See also
 Lawrence Line
 Thornton Line
 New York – New Jersey Line War

References

Pre-statehood history of New Jersey
History of the Thirteen Colonies
Borders of New Jersey